Mai Gaoling (born 12 September 1998) is a Chinese footballer currently playing as a goalkeeper for Meizhou Hakka.

Club career
Mai Gaoling would play for the Guangzhou team before being loaned out to second tier club Inner Mongolia Zhongyou on 15 August 2020. The following season he would go on to be loaned out again, this time to another second tier club in Beijing BSU where he made his debut in a league game on 30 April 2021 against Jiangxi Beidamen in a 1-0 defeat, where he came on as a substitute. The next season he would transfer to newly promoted top tier club Meizhou Hakka where he made his debut in a 2022 Chinese FA Cup game on 19 December 2022 against Chengdu Rongcheng in a 3-0 defeat.

Career statistics
.

References

External links

1998 births
Living people
Chinese footballers
Association football goalkeepers
China League One players
Guangzhou F.C. players
Inner Mongolia Zhongyou F.C. players
Beijing Sport University F.C. players
21st-century Chinese people

Meizhou Hakka F.C. players